Agyneta evadens is a species of sheet weaver found in Canada and the United States. It was described by Chamberlin in 1925.

References

evadens
Fauna of Canada
Fauna of the United States
Spiders of North America
Spiders described in 1925
Fauna without expected TNC conservation status